The Bundschuh movement (German: Bundschuh-Bewegung) refers to a series of localized peasant rebellions in southwestern Germany from 1493 to 1517. They were one of the causes of the German Peasants' War (1524–1526). The Bundschuh movement was not a movement in the proper sense, but a number of loosely linked local conspiracies and planned uprisings. It was so called because of the peasant shoe (Bundschuh) the peasants displayed on their flag. Under this flag, peasants and city dwellers had defeated the troops of the French count of Armagnac along the upper Rhine in 1439, 1443, and 1444.

Individual uprisings – seeking relief from oppressive taxes, arbitrary justice systems, high debts, costly ecclesiastic privileges, serfdom, prohibitions on hunting and fishing, and the like – occurred in 1476 in Niklashausen (Tauber valley), 1493 in Schlettstadt (now Sélestat)/Alsace (for the first time under the Bundschuh banner), 1502 in Bruchsal and Untergrombach, 1513 in Lehen (Breisgau), and 1517 along the upper Rhine.  Each of these was defeated very quickly, and the leaders, such as Joß Fritz, were generally executed.

Bundschuh 
As a sign displayed on their flag the peasants chose the Bundschuh (= tied shoe), a leather shoe typical of peasants. It was to symbolise the joint rising and advance of the peasants against their lords. It also contrasted the boots worn by knights with their spurs.

References

 Thomas Adam: Joß Fritz – das verborgene Feuer der Revolution. Bundschuhbewegung und Bauernkrieg am Oberrhein im frühen 16. Jahrhundert. Verlag Regionalkultur, Ubstadt-Weiher 2002,  (Veröffentlichungen der Historischen Kommission der Stadt Bruchsal. Band 20)
 Friedrich Engels: Der deutsche Bauernkrieg. 15. Auflage. Dietz, Berlin 1987, 
 Albert Rosenkranz: Der Bundschuh. Die Erhebungen des südwestdeutschen Bauernstandes in den Jahren 1493–1517. Winter, Heidelberg 1927 (Schriften des wissenschaftlichen Instituts der Elsaß-Lothringer im Reich)
 Wilhelm Zimmermann: Allgemeine Geschichte des großen Bauernkrieges. 3 Bände, Stuttgart 1841-1843; 2. Auflage in 2 Bänden unter dem Titel Geschichte des großen Bauernkrieges, Stuttgart 1856; viele weitere Ausgaben
 Allgemeine Geschichte des grossen Bauernkrieges Erster Theil,  Von Wilhelm Zimmermann, Stuttgart, Franz Heinrich Köhler, 1841  
 Allgemeine Geschichte des grossen Bauernkrieges Zweiter Theil,  Von Wilhelm Zimmermann, Stuttgart, Franz Heinrich Köhler, 1842 
 Geschichte des grossen Bauernkriegs 1. Band: Nach den Urkunden und Augenzeugen Von Wilhelm Zimmermann, Veröffentlicht von Rieger'sche Verlagsbuchhandlung (A. Benedict), 1856 
 Geschichte des grossen Bauernkriegs 2. Band: Nach den Urkunden und Augenzeugen Von Wilhelm Zimmermann, Veröffentlicht von Rieger'sche Verlagsbuchhandlung (A. Benedict), 1856:)

Rebellions in Germany
Peasant revolts
Rural community development
1524 in Europe
1525 in Europe
16th century in the Holy Roman Empire
16th-century rebellions
Conflicts in 1524
Conflicts in 1525
German Peasants' War